This article deals with productivity software created for the Amiga line of computers and covers the AmigaOS operating system and its derivates AROS and MorphOS and is a split of main article Amiga software.
See also related articles Amiga Internet and communications software, Amiga music software, Amiga programming languages, and Amiga support and maintenance software for other information regarding software that run on Amiga.

History
The Amiga originally supported such prestigious software titles as WordPerfect, Electronic Arts' Deluxe Paint, and Lattice C. Newtek's Video Toaster, one of the first all-in-one graphics and video editing packages, began on the Amiga. The Video Toaster was one of the few accessories for the "big box" Amigas (2000, 3000 and 4000) that used the video slot and enabled users to turn their Amiga into the heart of an entire TV production suite. The later addition of the Video Flyer by Newtek made possible the first non-linear video editing program for the Amiga. The Amiga made 3D raytracing graphics available for the masses with Sculpt 3D.  Before the Amiga, raytracing was only available for dedicated graphic workstations such as the SGI. Other raytracing software also included TurboSilver. The Amiga was well known for its 3D rendering capability, with many titles being added to the mix as the years went by. Some titles were later ported to Microsoft Windows and continue to thrive there, such as the rendering software Cinema 4D from Maxon, and LightWave from Newtek, which was originally part of the Video Toaster. The Video Toaster itself has even been ported to the Windows platform. LightWave was used for low-cost computer generated special effects during the early 1990s, with Babylon 5 being a notable example of a TV-series utilizing LightWave.
Even Microsoft produced software for use on the Amiga. AmigaBASIC, an advanced BASIC software development environment, complete with an integrated development environment (IDE), was written by Microsoft under contract.

Graphics software
Amiga had its beginnings in 1985 with a strong attitude for graphics, more so than other PCs of its age due to its peculiar hardware, and its multimedia chipset. The graphical chip Agnus could access directly RAM and pilot it with DMA (Direct Memory Access) privileges, and featured Bit Blitter and Copper circuits capable to move ranges of pixels on the screen and deal directly with the electronic beam of the TV set. It could render graphic screens of various number of colors (2, 4, 8, 16, 32, 64 and 4096 color HAM modes) starting from 320x200 up to 720x576 pixel graphic pages. Amiga released a vast number of graphics software programs, such as Graphicraft, Deluxe Paint, TVPaint, Photon Paint, Brilliance!, (a program entirely realized upon the suggestions and wishes of well known computer artist Jim Sachs), Aegis Images, ArtEffect, fxPAINT by IOSpirit, Personal Paint from Cloanto, Photogenics, Express Paint, Digi Paint, XiPaint, PerfectPaint, SketchBlock 24 bit painting program by Andy Broad for AmigaOS 4.x users

Graphic applications on AmigaOne systems 
Unlike Commodore Amiga systems, AmigaOne systems have no integrated multimedia chipsets. AmigaOne systems, similar to Mac or PC, sport AGP/PCIe graphic cards, embedded audio AC'97 sound system, and can use PCI/PCIe audio cards, even some professional models. The expanded capability of faster CPU performance, and the availability of standard expansion graphic cards, lead to a new generation of graphic software being born for the AmigaOne machines such as Hollywood "Visual Programming Suite".  This made it also easy to port modern Open Source software like Blender3D.

Visual programming 
Hollywood suite of programs by German software house Airsoft SoftWair is a multimedia and presentation program available for all Amigas (AmigaOS, MorphOS, AROS) and recently, a version of Hollywood became available for Microsoft Windows as well. It is able to load Scala projects and Microsoft PowerPoint ".PPT" files. Its module Hollywood Designer is not only a modern multimedia authoring software but also a true complete cross platform multimedia application layer capable of creating whole Amiga programs through a Visual design approach.  It also can save executables in various formats: 68k Amiga, WarpUP, AmigaOS 4 and MorphOS executables and Intel X86 code for AROS. Recent versions of Hollywood allow for creating executable programs for Intel Windows machines, Mac OS X for PPC processors and Mac OS X for Intel processors.

Modern graphic software 
There are fairly modern, recent graphic software that is available for AmigaOne machines, and some are still usable on Amiga platforms. TV Paint was born in 1991, and it was one of the first commercial 32bit graphic software on the market. Latest Amiga version (3.59) was released in 1994 and actually is distributed publicly, but the source code is still proprietary. It is still a valid graphic program, and continues to be used despite its age, due to its ease of use and its vast number of features. Programs like Candy Factory for AOS 4.0 are designed to create special effects for images, brushes and fonts to create gorgeous internet objects and buttons used in designing web pages. Pixel image editor, formerly Pixel32 is available for MorphOS. Blender 3D is one of the best Open Source cross platform software. Also a first pre-release of GIMP is available on AmigaOS 4.0 through the AmiCygnix X11 graphic engine.
Beginning with release 2.1 in 2008, MorphOS has included its own standard Paint utility called Sketch, simple but powerful, and AROS has bundled with the last free version of Luna Paint which become actually a commercial paint program for various operating systems.

Graphic utilities
As in any Operating Systems there can't exists only bitmap and vector paint software. All around these main software aimed at creating drawings directly by an author, or aimed at manipulating existing image files it exists a vast market of graphic utilities with peculiar features created in order to support main graphic programs. For example, in Amiga it existed very professional software and it is noteworthy to mention at least some the most important and widely used into Amiga market like Cinematte, CineMorph, Morph Plus, Impact!, Essence, Magic Lantern and Pixel 3D Pro, that were only some of the most notorious ones in the vast range of graphic utilities that could be purchased by skilled and professional users of Amiga platform in its golden age. Cinematte utility allow the user to easily make complex photo-realistic composites of subjects that are photographed against a bluescreen, or green screen background. It uses the same sophisticated techniques used worldwide in motion picture technology for precise bluescreen compositing. CineMorph it is a program to automatically create morphing effects between two given original images, and create a compound third image, or even all the animation movie associated with the morphing effect. Morph Plus performed same effects as Cinemorph. Impact! created physics simulation in 3D scenes. Essence was a texture maker to apply textures on 3D surfaces of objects created by 3D tracing programs. Amiga Magic Lantern was a true color animation compressor and player for the Amiga, Pixel 3D Pro utility it was used to create models for 3D objects and save it in various 3D formats, or to transform any model object from a 3D file format to another.

Vector graphics
Common widely used format for vector graphics in Amiga are EPS and IFF DR2D. It originated from the fact that Amiga was the first platform on which ran Ghostscript natively, and also IFF DR2D was the original standard for vector graphics generated by Amiga ProVector and later adopted by other applications such as Art Expression and Professional Draw. Foremost used Amiga drawing and vector graphics utilities are Aegis Draw, ProDraw (Professional Draw) from Gold Disk Inc., DrawStudio, Art Expression, ProVector, and for some basic vector graphics, also the tools of Professional Page and PageStream are useful. The most modern vector graphics programs on Amiga are actually MindSpace 1.1, which is aimed mainly at design flowcharts, mindtables, UML and diagrams, and Steam Draw a 2D simple vector paint program available for MorphOS.

Flash and SWF
SWFTools is a collection of command line programs to convert and save various raster(bitmap) image formats from and to Flash SWF vector animation format.

Tracing software
On AmigaOS are available the widely used free distributable vector to graphics conversion facilities Autotrace, Potrace, XTrace which can run also in AROS Amiga Open Source clone OS and MorphOS Amiga-Like system. The Desktop Publishing software PageStream has a tracing utility as bundled software. The structured drawing program ProVector had an optional add-on tracing utility named StylusTracer.

DXF, EMF, SVG file formats
Various programs can read DXF (almost all Amiga CAD programs), EMF, SVG, CGM, GEM, WMF, an example of converting tool that reads many formats and output DR2D is the Amiga program MetaView. It exists also a SVG Datatype to support directly in the OS, on any program, the feature of loading and saving files in SVG (Scalable Vector Graphics) format.

Computer aided design
At its beginning Amiga was considered to offer the most powerful graphic platform at a reasonable price. It had various CAD programs available for it, such as X-CAD, IntelliCAD, DynaCaDD, MaxonCAD, IntroCAD, and even programs to design and test electronic circuits, such as ElektroCAD.

Animation, Comics and Cartoons
Due to the peculiar capabilities of Amiga in multimedia, and the features of the bit blitter circuit, Amiga was capable of performing advanced animation and video authoring at professional level in the 1980s and thus it was created a vast amount of software which filled also this segment of the professional video editing market. For Amiga there were available animation programs like: Aegis Animator, Lights!Camera!Action!, DeLuxe Video, Disney Animation Studio, versions later than 3 of Deluxe Paint, The Director (a BASIC-like language oriented to animation), Scala, Vision from Commodore itself, VisualFX from ClassX, Adorage Multi Effect program from proDAD, Millennium from Nova Design. ImageFX, and Art Department Pro.
There been various animation software on the Amiga

Comic Setter was an interesting tools to create printed comics by arranging brushes representing comic characters, joining it with background images and superimposing it the right frames and "balloons" with their own text speech and captions. It could then print in color the comics that were created.

Disney Animation Studio was one of the most powerful 2D programs for realizing Animation. released on Amiga, this program, equipped also with a complete cell-frame preview feature was used by many animation studios worldwide at its age and still used by some several studios in Europe as a useful preview tool, The software is mainly used for Independent and amateur animators.

Authoring and VideoFX
In its golden age Amiga can count on a vast range of animation and video authoring software; Aegis Animator, Lights!Camera!Action!, DeLuxe Video, Disney Animation Studio, versions later than 3 of Deluxe Paint, The Director (a BASIC-like language oriented to animation), Scala, Amiga Vision from Commodore itself, VisualFX from ClassX, Adorage Multi Effect program from proDAD, Wildfire by Andreas Maschke (ported by author to Java later), Millennium from Nova Design, ImageFX from Nova Design, and Art Department Pro.

3D modeling, rendering and animation
3D rendering and animation software includes Sculpt 3D, TurboSilver, Aladdin4D, Videoscape 3D, Caligari, Maxon Cinema4D, Imagine, LightWave from Newtek, Real3D from Realsoft, Vista Pro, World Construction Set 3D terrain rendering programs, and Tornado3D by the Italian company Eyelight.

Amateur and professional video editing
Amiga was one of the first commercial computer platform to allow amateur and professional video editing, due to its capability in connecting to TV sets, Video codecs and deal with Chroma-Key, Genlock signal, at full screen with overscan features, and a good noise-gain ratio.
Amiga and its video peripherals (mainly Genlock boxes and digitizing boxes) in the nineties were available at reasonable prices and then this made the Amiga to become one of the professional video market leader platforms. It was also capable of dealing with broadcast video production (Newtek VideoToaster), and in the age around the 1992–1994, despite of the Commodore demise, Amiga knew its golden age as a professional video platform and there were available for Amiga a vast amount of any kind of video software, graphic facilities and reselling of any of GFX and image gallery data files that could be applied to video productions. Amongst these software it is worth mentioning the main Amiga video-editing programs for desktop video with both linear and non linear editing with 4.2.2 capabilities as the ones from Newtek available with VideoToaster Flyer external module for Video Toaster and just called NLE! (Non Linear Editing), Amiga MainActor, Broadcaster 32 and Elite (with Producer software), Wildfire by Andreas Maschke for vfx (now in Java), expansion Amiga cards PAR, VLab Motion (with Movishop software) and VLab Pro.

Word processing and page layout
While desktop video proved to be a major market for the Amiga, a surge of word processing, page layout and graphic software filled out the professional needs starting from the first Amiga text program Textcraft which was a mix between a real word processor and an advanced text editor, but capable of changing page layouts, fonts, enlarging or reducing their width, changing their colors and adding color images to the text.

Notable word processing programs for Amiga included the then-industry standard WordPerfect up to version 4.1, Shakespeare, Excellence, Maxon Word, Final Writer, Amiga Writer, Scribble!, ProWrite, Wordworth and the little Personal Write by Cloanto.

The page layout software included Page Setter and Professional Page from Gold Disk Inc., and PageStream by Soft-Logik, known today as Grasshopper LLC. Only PageStream was ported to other platforms and continues to be developed and supported by the developers. Graphic software included vector drawing applications like Art Expression from Soft-Logik, ProVector by Stylus, Inc. (formerly Taliesin), Draw Studio, and Professional Draw from Gold Disk Inc.

Amiga lacked an office suite as the term is meant now, but integrated software was available. Pen Pal was a word processor integrated with a database and a form editor.  Scribble!, Analyze! and Organize! were bundled together as the Works! suite combining a word processor, spreadsheet and database.  Despite the similarity in name, it had no connection to Microsoft Works.

The page layout language LaTeX was available in two ports: AmigaTeX, which is no longer available (the first LaTeX can be edited with a front end program), and PasTEX, available on Aminet repository.

Modern software AbiWord is available today on AmigaOS 4.0 through the AmiCygnix X11 graphical engine, Scriba and Papyrus Office pre-release is available for MorphOS.

Text editors
Text editors available on Amiga include Vim, Emacs and MicroEMACS (included), Cygnus Editor also known as CED, and GoldED, which then evolved in 2006 into Cubic IDE. The UNIX ne editor and the vi-clone Vim were initially developed on the Amiga.

Development of Text editors never stopped in Amiga. Since 2001, in MorphOS, a limited edition version of GoldEd called MorphEd is available, and since 2008 Cinnamon Writer and NoWin ED, a universal editor which runs on any Amiga-like platform, are available. Cinnamon Writer is increasing new features to all new releases and aspires to become a full-featured WordProcessor.

Database and spreadsheets
In the first age of Amiga (1986–1989) there were cross-platform spreadsheets available, such as MaxiPlan, which was available also for MS-DOS and Macintosh. Logistix (real name LoGisTiX), one of the first spreadsheets for Amiga, Microfiche Filer Plus was a database which gave the user the experience of exploring data as using microfilms. SuperBase was one of the finest programs available for C64. It was then ported on Atari, Amiga, and later on PC. But on Amiga, it would become a standard reference, available in two versions Superbase Personal and SuperBase Professional It could handle SQL databases and had a query internal language such as BASIC. It was capable of creating forms and masks on records and handling multimedia files into its records years before Microsoft Access. Superbase also featured VCR control style buttons to browse records of any database. Softwood File II was another simple multimedia database which then evolved into Final Data, a good database available for Amiga from Softwood Inc. From the same firm there was Final Calc, a very powerful spreadsheet, similar to TurboCalc from the German company Schatztruhe. ProChart was a tool to draw flow charts and diagrams. Analyze! was a fairly full featured (for the time) spreadsheet developed for the Amiga. Organize! was a flat file database package. Gnumeric spreadsheet has also been ported on Amiga through an X11 engine called AmiCygnix.

In recent times MUIbase was born and mainly cross-platform MySQL database language became a reference on Amiga also. SQLite, a self-contained, embeddable, zero-configuration SQL database engine, can also be found available on AmigaOS 4 and MorphOS.

In February 2010, Italian programmer Andrea Palmatè ported IODBC standard to AmigaOS 4.

Science, entertainment and special use programs
Maple V is one of the best general purpose mathematics software (a.k.a. Mathematic-CAD) ever made. It was available for Amiga also, and appreciated by many scientists using Amiga in its time. Distant Suns, Galileo, Digital Almanac and Amiga Digital Universe (from Bill Eaves for the OS4) were stellar sky exploring programs and astronomic calculators. During the age of CDTV many historic, science, and art CDs like Timetable of Science, Innovation, Timetable of Business, Politics, Grolier's Encyclopedia, Guinness Disk of Records, Video Creator, American Heritage Dictionary, Illustrated Holy Bible, Illustrated Works of Shakespeare, etc. were available.

Entertainment
For Amiga there were literally hundreds of entertainment software. Some notable programs for kids and learning were: Adventures in Math series of floppy disks, from Free Spirit Software, Animal Kingdom series of disks from Unicorn Software, Art School all the series of Barney Bear software, the Discovery series, including Discovery trivia, Donald's Alphabet Chase, Mickey's 123's and Mickey's ABC's by Disney Software, the Electric Crayon and Ferngully series of educational coloring book software (Ferngully was taken from the animated feature film), Fun School series of disks, Kid Pix set of disks from the well known Broderbund Software house, which was famous in the nineties, Miracle Piano Teaching System to teach music to kids, various tales of Mother Goose, and World Atlas by Centaur Software.

Fractals, virtual reality, artificial intelligence
ZoneXplorer from Elena Novaretti is considered amongst Amiga users one of the best fractal experience programs ever made on Amiga, if not on any platform. In 1989 the X-Specs 3D Glasses from Haitex Resources, one of the first interactive 3D solutions for home computers were created. Also created on Amiga, were the multimedia interactive TV non immersive Virtual reality exploring software Mandala from Vivid Group Inc., and the Virtuality System Virtuality 1000 CS 3D VRML all-immersive simulator from W-Industries (then Virtuality Inc.), for game entertainment in big arcade installations and theme parks, based on A3000.

Magellan v.1.1 (Artificial Intelligence Software), not to be confused with Directory Opus Magellan, was a program to emulate Artificial intelligence responses on Amiga, by creating heuristic programmed rules based on machine learning in its form of supervised learning. The user would choose into decision trees and decision tables system of AI featured by the Magellan program, in which to input objects, and desired outputs and describe all associate conditions and rules which the machine should follow in order to output pseudo-intelligent solutions to given problems.

Route planning
AmiATLAS v.6, was a complete Route planner tool for Amiga computers. It provided worldwide interactive maps and found optimal routes for traveling from one place to another. It also featured multiple map loading, an integrated CityGuide-System with information to interesting towns, places or regions, some even with pictures, and information about many parks and points of interest.

Personal organizer, notebook, diary software
Digita Organizer v.1.1 from Digita International was the best Amiga program to let the user to note about dates, meetings, remember expiry dates, etcetera. PolyOrga for MorphOS by Frédéric Rignault.

Personal budget, home banking, accounts
Easy Banker, Home Accounts, Small Business Accounts, Small Business Manager, Account Master, Accountant, AmigaMoney, Banca Base III, HomeBank, CashMaster, Counting House, etc.

Software for special purposes
AVT (Amiga Video Transceiver), was a software and hardware Slow-scan television system originally developed by "Black Belt Systems" (USA) around 1990 for the Amiga home computer popular all over the world before the IBM PC family gained sufficient audio quality with the help of special sound cards.

Richmond Sound Design (RSD) created both show control (a.k.a. MSC or "MIDI Show Control") and theatre sound design software which was used extensively in the theatre, theme park, display, exhibit, stage managing, show and themed entertainment industries in the 1980s and 1990s and at one point in the mid 90s, there were many high-profile shows at major theme parks around the world being controlled by Amigas through software simply called Stage Manager which then evolved into its Microsoft Windows version called ShowMan. There were dozens at Walt Disney World alone and more at all other Disney, Universal Studios, Six Flags and Madame Tussauds properties as well as in many venues in Las Vegas including The Mirage hotel Volcano and Siegfried and Roy show, the MGM Grand EFX show, Broadway theatre, London's West End, the Royal Shakespeare Company's many venues, most of Branson, Missouri's theatres, and scores of theatres on cruise ships, amongst hundreds of others. RSD purchased used Amigas on the web and reconditioned them to provide enough systems for all the shows that specified them and only stopped providing new Amiga installations in 2000. There are still an unknown number of shows on cruise ships and in themed venues being run by Amigas.

References 

 An interesting interview to Italian Cartoon Studio Strane Mani is available at Amiworld.it (In Italian language).
 Info on Virtuality at Amiga Hardware site

Amiga
Productivity
Lists of software
Multimedia
New media
Animation software
Multimedia software